ONE Bonus Awards :A cash bonus known as the "ONE Warrior bonus" was introduced on 9 July 2014 and implemented for the first time at ONE Fighting Championship: War of Dragons on 11 July 2014.

An award of US$50,000 is given out at the end of certain events to the fighter who impresses the most in terms of:

 thrilling the fans with exciting action;
 demonstrating an incredible warrior spirit;
 exhibiting amazing skill, and;
 delivering a phenomenal finish.

Victor Cui stated that bonuses would be handed out on a discretionary basis: "For every event, the bar will be very, very high. If a few fighters impress me, then I will hand out the bonus to a few fighters. If no one impresses me, then no one will get it. Extraordinary performance deserves extraordinary rewards. Ordinary performances deserve ordinary rewards."

The "ONE Warrior bonus" of $50,000 was re-introduced in January 2022, with a minimum of one bonus and a maximum of five bonuses awarded at each event.

Award recipients

References

External links 
 
 List of Events on Sherdog

bonus
Kickboxing-related lists
Mixed martial arts lists
Lists of sports awards